The Shafat Glacier  —  Parkachik Glacier is a  long glacier in the Himalayan Range in Ladakh, India.

Geography 

The Shafat Glacier — Parkachik Glacier gives rise to the two mountain peaks of Nun and Kun which have an elevation of more than 6800 meters, and it provides a base to climb these mountain peaks. It lies at an average elevation of 4400 meters. The melt waters add to the flow of the Suru River which is a tributary of the Indus River.

The Shafat Glacier/Parkachik Glacier is a broken, ice falling glacier melting at an alarming rate due to the Global warming,

References

Glaciers of Jammu and Kashmir
Glaciers of Ladakh